Associated British Picture Corporation (ABPC), originally British International Pictures (BIP), was a British film production, distribution and exhibition company active from 1927 until 1970 when it was absorbed into EMI. ABPC also owned approximately 500 cinemas in Britain by 1943, and in the 1950s and 60s owned a station on the ITV television network. The studio was partly owned by Warner Bros. from about 1940 until 1969; the American company also owned a stake in ABPC's distribution arm, Warner-Pathé, from 1958. It formed one half of a vertically integrated film industry duopoly in Britain with the Rank Organisation.

History

From 1927 to 1945
The company was founded during 1927 by Scottish solicitor John Maxwell after he had purchased British National Pictures Studios and its Elstree Studios complex and merged it with his ABC Cinemas circuit, renaming the company British International Pictures. The Wardour Film Company, with Maxwell as chairman, was the distributor of BIP films. He appointed Joseph Grossman, formerly manager of the Stoll Studios, his Studio Manager.

During its early years the company's most prominent work was that directed by Alfred Hitchcock, including the film Blackmail (1929), usually regarded as the first British all-talkie. Hitchcock worked on a total of twelve pictures for the company before leaving in 1933 to work for the rival British Gaumont, due to his dissatisfaction with the projects he was assigned at British International.

Under Maxwell's paternalistic management the company prospered and during 1933 it acquired British Pathé, which as Associated British-Pathé now functioned as the distribution division. The company was renamed Associated British Picture Corporation in 1933 and was now in a position to vertically integrate production, distribution and exhibition of films.

After Maxwell's death in October 1940, his widow Catherine sold a large number of shares to Warner Bros., who, although the Maxwell family remained the largest shareholders, were able to exercise a measure of control. The studio at Elstree was taken over by the government for the duration of the war. Film production was restricted to B-Pictures made at the company's smaller studio in Welwyn Garden City, which closed in 1950.

After the Second World War
Much of the output of the studio was routine, which restricted its success outside the UK, but after World War II, the company contracted with Warner (by now the largest shareholder, owning 40% of the studio) for the distribution of its films in the United States.

Robert Clark was head of production for the company between 1949 and 1958, and insisted on tight budgeting and the use of pre-existing properties such as books or plays as these already had a demonstrated "public value". Of the 21 films made by ABPC during the 1950s, only two were derived from original screenplays. German-born Frederick Gotfurt was Clark's scenario editor in this period, but his command of English was imperfect and the contracted actor Richard Todd doubted Gotfurt's ability to access the quality of the dialogue in a script. "It was a dreadful place", said Richard Attenborough when remembering ABPC's Elstree facility. "It created nothing in terms of a feeling of commitment." During this period though, the company produced its best remembered titles such as The Dam Busters (Michael Anderson, 1954), and Ice Cold in Alex (1958), whose director J. Lee Thompson was ABPC's most productive during the 1950s.

In 1958, Associated Talking Pictures, the parent company of Ealing Films, was acquired.

Expansion into television

In 1955, the Independent Television Authority (ITA) awarded one of the four initial contracts for commercial television in the UK to ABPC (after original awardee Kemsley-Winnick Television collapsed). The contract was to provide programming on the new ITV network in the Midlands and northern England on Saturdays and Sundays. The board of ABPC had been unconvinced by the merits of entering the television market, but were eventually convinced by the ITA who believed they were the only acceptable option to take the contract. Former head of British Pathé Howard Thomas was appointed as the station's managing director.

Under the name ABC Television, the company came on the air in stages between February and November 1956. Among many television series ABC produced were Opportunity Knocks, The Avengers, Redcap, and the long-running Armchair Theatre drama anthology series.

Following a reallocation of the ITV franchises, ABC Television ceased to exist in 1968; however, unwilling to eject ABPC from the system, the ITA awarded the contract for weekdays in London to a new company that would be joint-owned by ABPC and British Electric Traction (parent company of outgoing franchisee Rediffusion), with ABPC holding a 51% controlling stake. Both companies were initially reluctant to this "shotgun merger", but eventually the new station, christened Thames Television, took to the air in July 1968 (two days after ABC's last broadcast). The 51% controlling stake passed to EMI upon its acquisition of ABPC the following year.

From 1958 onwards
Policies changed after Clark left in January 1958. New projects from the company were limited to those using contracted television comedy performers, and investment in independent productions. The use of Elstree for television production increased. Later successful features from ABPC itself included several films built around the pop singer Cliff Richard, such as The Young Ones (1961) and Summer Holiday (1963).

In 1962, the company acquired 50% of the shares of Anglo-Amalgamated, and made an arrangement with the Grade Organisation to support the production of films by independent producers. During the 1960s, however, the fortunes of the company declined, and in 1967 Seven Arts, the new owners of Warner, decided to dispose of its holdings in ABPC which was purchased in 1968 by EMI, who acquired the remaining stock the following year. (For the subsequent history, see EMI Films.) The entire ABPC library is now owned by StudioCanal.

Subsidiaries of Associated British Picture Corporation

Wholly owned
 Associated British Productions Ltd. – Associated British Studios
 Associated British Cinemas Ltd. – ABC Cinemas
 Associated British-Pathé Ltd. – 1933 
 Associated British Film Distributors Ltd. – usually only known by its initials ABFD
 British and Overseas Film Sales Ltd.
 Pathé Laboratories Ltd.
 Associated British Cinemas (Television) Ltd. – 1955 – ABC Weekend TV
 A.B.C. Television Ltd. –  – ABC Weekend TV
 A.B.C. Television Films Ltd. – 1966  – Associated British Corporation

Jointly owned
 Warner-Pathé Distributors Ltd. (50%) – from 1958
 Anglo-Amalgamated Film Distributors (50%) – from 1962
 Thames Television Ltd. (51%) – from 1968

Select filmography

References

External links
 

Associated British Picture Corporation
Defunct film and television production companies of the United Kingdom